The following lists events that happened in 1921 in El Salvador.

Incumbents
President: Jorge Meléndez 
Vice President: Alfonso Quiñónez Molina

Events

June
 19 June – C.D. El Vencedor, a Salvadoran football club, was established.

Undated
 C.D. Once Berlinés, a Salvadoran football club, was established.

Births
 2 September – Julio Adalberto Rivera Carballo, politician (d. 1973)

Deaths
 9 January – Rafael Antonio Gutiérrez, politician (b. 1845)

References

 
El Salvador
1920s in El Salvador
Years of the 20th century in El Salvador
El Salvador